Everyday Italian is a Food Network show hosted by Giada De Laurentiis.  In the show, De Laurentiis focuses for her viewers on traditional Italian cuisine with an American flair.

Popularity
The show is recorded (shot at 24 frames for a cinematic feel) on location in Malibu, Pasadena and the Pacific Palisades, shunning the traditional Food Network sets and instead using a series of rented homes. All of the cooking on the show is shot live on set during an initial run and later the close up shots are recorded during a second run. De Laurentiis often features family members in episodes, most notably fashion designer husband Todd Thompson.  Her mother, aunt, brother, and sister have also appeared in several episodes, occasionally working side-by-side with De Laurentiis in the kitchen.  Giada's Aunt Raffy is the family member featured most often on the show; bringing recipes for such specialties as Chestnut Stuffing and Turkey Tonnato. Giada announced on Food Network's website that the show is no longer in production as of February 2008, just before the birth of her first child.

The success of Everyday Italian has led to the publication of three related cookbooks, Everyday Italian: 125 Simple and Delicious Recipes, Giada's Family Dinners, and Everyday Pasta.

Awards and honors
The show was nominated for two Daytime Emmy Awards in 2006, as well as in 2007.  Giada de Laurentis won a Daytime Emmy Award for Outstanding Lifestyle Host, and the series won the Daytime Emmy Award for Outstanding Lifestyle Program in 2008.

The show has also given rise to other shows starring De Laurentiis, including Giada's Weekend Getaways, Behind the Bash, and a number of specials, including Giada's Italian Holiday, featuring chef Mario Batali.

References

External links 
Everyday Italian on The Food Network

2000s American cooking television series
Food Network original programming